200 More Miles: Live Performances 1985–1994 is a 1995 album by the Canadian alt-country band Cowboy Junkies.

The album is a compilation of live performances by the band, dating from the band's earliest years as a local independent band in Toronto to their 1990s tours as international rock stars.

Track listing

References

External links 

Cowboy Junkies live albums
1995 live albums
RCA Records live albums